Elizabeth "Liz" Collins (born November 29, 1982) is a female swimmer from Canada, who mostly competes in the freestyle events. Collins won three silver medals at the 2007 Pan American Games in Rio de Janeiro, Brazil. She is starting her third year of coaching Vancouver Pacific Swim Club in Vancouver, British Columbia.

References
Elizabeth Collins
Vancouver Pacific Swim Club
Elizabeth Collins Image

1982 births
Living people
Canadian female freestyle swimmers
Swimmers from Ottawa
University of British Columbia alumni
Swimmers at the 2003 Pan American Games
Swimmers at the 2007 Pan American Games
Pan American Games silver medalists for Canada
Pan American Games bronze medalists for Canada
Pan American Games medalists in swimming
Medalists at the 2003 Pan American Games
Medalists at the 2007 Pan American Games
21st-century Canadian women